Plaza de toros de Las Palomas, officially Monumental Las Palomas, is a bullring in Algeciras at the southern end of Spain. The current building was built in 1969 and it can hold over 11,000 spectators.

History

Records of bullfights in Algeciras on an informal and irregular nature go back to 1765, but the first formal fight was in 1851 when a square was built that held 8,000 people. By 1866 this was considered inadequate and a group of people got together to buy the existing bullring and rebuild it. The new ring was ready by 1868 and it served well for a hundred years. However by 1969 the ring was again to small and because the town now surrounded it is could be not be expanded. A new bullring was built in 1969.

Since then a grant of over 100,000 Euros has enabled a new classroom to be built for the bullfighting school.

References

Bullrings in Spain
Buildings and structures in Algeciras